KVG College of Engineering (KVGCE) is one of many engineering colleges in Karnataka, India. It was established in 1986 based on one of the government aided initiatives in technical education in Southern Karnataka State. It is located in Kurunjibhag, Sullia, Dakshina Kannada and is affiliated to Visvesvaraya Technological University (VTU), Belgaum.

KVGCE has an Academy of Liberal Education  led by Founder & Chairman Kurunji Venkatramana Gowda & Active General Secretary K V Renuka Prasad.

History
K.V.G. College of Engineering sponsored by Academy of Liberal Education (R) Sullia D. K. is located in Kurunjibhag and is one of the largest mega educational complexes in India.

The campus is offering Diploma, Graduate and Post Graduate Programmes in Engineering, Management, Medicine, Dental, Ayurvedic, Nursing, Polytechnic, ITI, Law, Science, Commerce, Arts etc. 

KVG College is one of the engineering colleges in Karnataka, India. The engineering college, started in 1986, was one of the first semi government sector initiatives in technical education in Dakshina Kannada District. Popularly known as KVGCE, it is located in Kurunjibhag, Sullia, Dakshina Kannada.

Admission
Students are admitted to undergraduate courses on basis of their merit in the Karnataka CET test, or in the COMED-K undergraduate test. Students are also admitted through a management quota, which places no merit requirement; students are directly admitted to a course upon the orders of the college management (in this case, the managing trust). There is a lateral entry scheme in place, by which students holding diploma degrees can enter directly to the second year of study in engineering. Students, upon graduating, receive a Bachelor of Engineering. The total undergraduate strength allotted to the college is 240 per year.

Students are admitted to postgraduate courses on basis of their GATE test scores, as well as on their Post Graduate Karnataka CET scores. Students, upon graduating receive a Master of Technology, Master of Computer Applications or a Master of Business Administration degree. The total postgraduate strength allotted to the college is 160.

Departments and courses

Undergraduate 
These departments offer four-year undergraduate courses in engineering. All of the undergraduate courses have been conferred government aided college status by the Visvesvaraya Technological University, Belgaum

Bachelor of Engineering
List of under graduate programs offered at KVGCE
Bachelor of Engineering in Civil Engineering
Bachelor of Engineering in Computer Science Engineering
Bachelor of Engineering in Electronics and Communication Engineering
Bachelor of Engineering in Mechanical Engineering
The allied departments of the college are the departments of Physics, Chemistry, Mathematics, Humanities, and that of placement and training.

Postgraduate courses
Postgraduate courses offered by the college are not autonomous, and they remain fully under the ambit of the university.

Master of Technology (MTech) 
The Institute offers 2-year Master of Technology (MTech) in the following Branches.
Digital Communication
Digital Electronics And Communication
Software Engineering
Computer Engineering
Manufacturing Science & Engineering
Computer Application in Industrial Drives

MBA
KVGCE also offers 2-year Master of Business Administration Program

Activities
The institute organizes co-curricular and extra curricular activities. Unofficial student groups in the college include:
 Organize Blood donation camps every year.
 NSS - National Service Scheme
 RISE - Representatives of Information Science & Engineering.

References

External links

 

Engineering colleges in Karnataka
Universities and colleges in Dakshina Kannada district